The 1996 NBA draft was the 50th draft in the National Basketball Association (NBA). It was held on June 26, 1996 at  Continental Airlines Arena in East Rutherford, New Jersey. In this draft, NBA teams took turns selecting college basketball players and other first-time eligible players, such as players from high schools and non-North American leagues. The Vancouver Grizzlies had the highest probability to win the NBA draft lottery, but since they were an expansion team along with the Toronto Raptors, they were not allowed to select first in this draft. The team with the second-highest probability, the Philadelphia 76ers, won the lottery and obtained the first selection. The Toronto Raptors and the Vancouver Grizzlies were second and third, respectively.

It is widely considered to be one of the deepest and most talented NBA drafts in history, with one-third of the first-round picks later becoming NBA All-Stars. The draft class produced three players who won a combined four NBA MVP awards (Kobe Bryant, Allen Iverson, Steve Nash), seven other drafted players who became All-Stars (Shareef Abdur-Rahim, Ray Allen, Žydrūnas Ilgauskas, Stephon Marbury, Jermaine O'Neal, Peja Stojaković, Antoine Walker), and one undrafted All-Star (Ben Wallace), for a grand total of 11 All-Stars. Moreover, eight players from this draft class have been named to at least one All-NBA Team, the most among any draft. The draft class also produced three players who have been named to the NBA's all-defensive first team: Bryant, Marcus Camby, and Wallace. Camby won the Defensive Player of the Year Award in 2007, while Wallace earned the same award in 2002, 2003, 2005, and 2006. Five-time NBA champion Derek Fisher was also selected in the draft.

The 76ers selected two future Major League Baseball players, Mark Hendrickson and Ryan Minor, with their second-round picks.

Most experts rate it along with the 1984 NBA draft and 2003 NBA draft as one of the best drafts in history. Sports Illustrated named it the second-best, behind the 1984 draft, which included a draft class of Hakeem Olajuwon, Michael Jordan, Charles Barkley, and John Stockton.

Key

Draft selections

Notable undrafted players
The following are undrafted players of the 1996 NBA Draft but later played in the NBA.

Early entrants

College underclassmen
The following college basketball players successfully applied for early draft entrance.

  Shareef Abdur-Rahim – F, California (freshman)
  Ray Allen – G, Connecticut (junior)
  Marcus Camby – C, Massachusetts (junior)
  Erick Dampier – C, Mississippi State (junior)
  Randy Edney – C, Mount St. Mary's (junior)
  Eric Gingold – C, Williams (junior)
  LeMarcus Golden – G, Memphis (junior)
  Ronnie Henderson – G, LSU (junior)
  Allen Iverson – G, Georgetown (sophomore)
  Willie Jackson – F, Lawson CC (freshman)
  Dontae' Jones – F, Mississippi State (junior)
  Chris Kingsbury – G, Iowa (junior)
  Idris Lee – G, Mount Senario (junior)
  Randy Livingston – G, LSU (sophomore)
  Michael Lloyd – G, Auburn Montgomery (junior)
  Stephon Marbury – G, Georgia Tech (freshman)
  Richard Matienzo – F, Miami Dade (freshman)
  Dut Mayar Madut – C, Frank Phillips (freshman)
  Jeff McInnis – G, North Carolina (junior)
  Chris Nurse – F, Delaware State (junior)
  Jason Osborne – F, Louisville (junior)
  Jessie Pate – G, Arkansas (junior)
  Vitaly Potapenko – F/C, Wright State (sophomore)
  Darnell Robinson – F/C, Arkansas (junior)
  Greg Simpson – G, West Virginia (junior)
  Kevin Simpson – G, Dixie (sophomore)
  Antoine Walker – F, Kentucky (sophomore)
  Samaki Walker – F, Louisville (sophomore)
  Lorenzen Wright – F, Memphis (sophomore)

High school players
The following high school players successfully applied for early draft entrance.

  Kobe Bryant – G, Lower Merion HS (Philadelphia, Pennsylvania)
  Taj McDavid – G, Palmetto HS (Williamston, South Carolina)
  Jermaine O'Neal – F, Eau Claire HS (Columbia, South Carolina)

International players
The following international players successfully applied for early draft entrance.

  Zydrunas Ilgauskas – C, Atletas (Lithuania)
  Efthimios Rentzias – F/C, PAOK (Greece)
  Peja Stojaković – F, PAOK (Greece)

Other eligible players

See also
 List of first overall NBA draft picks

References

External links

 1996 NBA Draft at Basketball-reference.com

Draft
National Basketball Association draft
NBA draft
NBA draft
20th century in East Rutherford, New Jersey
Basketball in New Jersey
Events in East Rutherford, New Jersey
Sports in East Rutherford, New Jersey